The Kpelle National Forest is found in Liberia. It was established in 1961. This site is 1748 km.

References 

Protected areas of Liberia
Protected areas established in 1961
Gbarpolu County